Khadzhimurat Soltanovich Gatsalov (born December 11, 1982, in Chikola, North Ossetia–Alania) is a Russian wrestler. As of February 2020, he represents Armenia.

He won the gold medal in the freestyle 96 kg class in the 2004 Summer Olympics, he beat future UFC Light Heavyweight and Heavyweight Champion Daniel Cormier in the semi-finals. He won five world medals in the 96 kg class at the FILA Wrestling World Championships. In 2013, he moved up to the 120 kg class and won a gold medal at the FILA Wrestling World Championships. He started his senior level competitive career at 84 kg in 2002 before moving up to 96 kg and 120 kg. Khadzhimurat is a devout Sunni Muslim

In 2014, Gatsalov became Cormier's training partner ahead of Cormier's fight against Jon Jones at UFC 182.

References

External links
 

1982 births
Living people
Russian male sport wrestlers
Olympic wrestlers of Russia
Wrestlers at the 2004 Summer Olympics
Olympic gold medalists for Russia
Olympic medalists in wrestling
European Games competitors for Russia
Wrestlers at the 2015 European Games
World Wrestling Championships medalists
Medalists at the 2004 Summer Olympics
People from Irafsky District
Russian people of Ossetian descent
Sportspeople from North Ossetia–Alania
World Wrestling Champions